Nobuyasu (written: 信康, 信寧, 伸康) is a masculine Japanese given name. Notable people with the name include:

 (1549–1578), Japanese samurai
 (1556–1614), Japanese samurai
 (born 1970), Japanese footballer
 (1559–1579), Japanese noble
 (born 1946), Japanese singer
 (1553–1617), Japanese samurai
 (1739–1784), Japanese daimyō

Japanese masculine given names